San Antonio, or unofficially San Ann as the locals call it, is a city in Pasco County, Florida, United States. It is a suburban city included in the Tampa-St. Petersburg-Clearwater, Florida Metropolitan Statistical Area.  It lies within Florida's 12th congressional district. The population was 1,138 at the 2010 census. It was established as a Catholic colony by Judge Edmund F. Dunne. The city derives its name from Saint Anthony of Padua. Saint Leo University is located nearby.

Geography

San Antonio is located at  (28.336649, −82.275011).

San Antonio has a rolling topography with elevations varying from a low of 110 feet on the western edge of the city to as high as 183 feet on a hill overlooking Lake Jovita on the eastern edge of town.

History

San Antonio was founded (in name only) in 1881 by Edmund F. Dunne who previously had been chief justice of the Arizona territory. Dunne was a legal counsel involved in the Disston Land Purchase, and as his commission, received 100,000 choice acres (400 km2) of land out of the 4,000,000 acre (16,000 km) purchase. The following year on February 15, while surveying the Disston Purchase with his cousin, Captain Hugh Dunne, he came upon a previously unsurveyed lake with crystal clear water. Seeing in a prayer book that it was the feast day  of St. Jovita, he named the lake after the early Christian martyr. Judge Dunne selected the city's location on Jovita's western shore and began settling it in earnest. He established the city as the center of a Catholic colony in Florida.  Dunne planned several other villages for the surrounding area including St. Thomas, Villa Maria, Carmel and San Felipe, but only the rural community of St. Joseph survives today. In 1889 the Benedictines established the monastery of St. Leo and St. Leo College on Dunne's former homestead and farm land, later incorporating the area as part of a separate town, St. Leo, Florida. At about the same time, five Benedictine sisters established Holy Name Convent in the center of San Antonio. The nuns had come to teach at two local schools (St. Anthony School and St. Joseph School), as well as to establish Holy Name Academy. The sisters had the convent and the academy physically moved by oxen to a 40-acre parcel in St. Leo overlooking the southwestern shore of Lake Jovita in 1911. The nuns remained at St. Anthony School until the end of the 2009–2010 academic year. At the time of its founding San Antonio was located in the southern third of Hernando County, as Pasco County was not created until 1887. The Orange Belt Railway first began service to San Antonio in November 1887. For a short time beginning in 1927, the city officially changed its name to the town of Lake Jovita, only to revert to San Antonio in 1933.

Demographics

As of the census of 2000, there were 655 people, 270 households, and 180 families residing in the village. The racial makeup of the village was 97.25% White, 1.07% Asian, 0.31% from other races, and 1.37% from two or more races. Hispanic or Latino of any race were 6.41% of the population.

There were 270 households, out of which 33.7% had children under the age of 18 living with them, 54.8% were married couples living together, 10.7% had a female householder with no husband present, and 33.3% were non-families. 29.3% of all households were made up of individuals, and 7.4% had someone living alone who was 65 years of age or older.  The average household size was 2.43 and the average family size was 3.03.

In the village the population was spread out, with 27.2% under the age of 18, 8.4% from 18 to 24, 29.3% from 25 to 44, 24.0% from 45 to 64, and 11.1% who were 65 years of age or older.  The median age was 36 years. For every 100 females, there were 92.6 males.  For every 100 females age 18 and over, there were 87.1 males.

The median income for a household in the village was $43,125, and the median income for a family was $58,750. Males had a median income of $39,375 versus $27,031 for females. The per capita income for the village was $20,287.  About 9.8% of families and 10.1% of the population were below the poverty line, including 15.7% of those under age 18 and 14.6% of those age 65 or over.

Controversial 2000 census data
In a story that wound up on the front page of The New York Times, many of the 2000 census numbers were disputed by the City Clerk of San Antonio based on the fact the city had 336 residential water customers at the time. The Clerk further asserted that most of the residents received their mail via post office box, which the US Census Bureau would not send forms to. City officials speculated that the population that year was probably closer to 900, which would be more consistent with the growth reflected in data collected in other cities throughout the county, as well as Pasco County as a whole. The 2010 census count of 1,138 residents was considered to be much more accurate.

Education

 San Antonio is home to two schools. Saint Anthony Catholic School (grades K–8) traces its roots to the Fall of 1883 when local widow Cecilia Morse began teaching colony children in her home. By April 1884 it was officially established as a Catholic school and is by far the oldest school of any kind in Pasco County. In fact it actually predates the county by several years. San Antonio Elementary (grades K–5) was founded 98 years later in 1981 and though its campus lies entirely within San Antonio's city limits, its mailing address is actually Dade City, Florida. Holy Name Academy (grades 1–12) was established in 1889 as an "all-girls" boarding school by the Benedictine Sisters of Florida, but moved to the neighboring town of St. Leo in 1911.

Notable people

 Chris Arnade, former Wall Street trader and documentarian, grew up in San Antonio

References

External links

City of San Antonio official site
San Antonio Area Information A private community site with local happenings
History of San Antonio (Fivay.org)

Cities in Pasco County, Florida
Cities in the Tampa Bay area
Populated places established in 1882
Cities in Florida
Catholic Church in Florida
1882 establishments in Florida